Watchara Krearum (born May 11, 1986) simply known as Tum or Sieng (Thai: ตั้ม / เซียง). He is a retired professional footballer from Buriram, Thailand.

Honor

Ubon UMT United
Regional League Division 2:
Winners : 2015
Regional League North-East Division
 Runner-up : 2015

Krabi F.C.
Regional League Division 2
 Third place  :2011
Regional League South Division
 Runner-up  : 2011

Buriram F.C.
Regional League Division 2
 Winners  :2010
Regional League North-East Division
 Runner-up  :2010

References
 http://www.supersubthailand.com/player_profile/detail/4-129-1272-%E0%B8%A7%E0%B8%B1%E0%B8%8A%E0%B8%A3%E0%B8%B0_%E0%B9%80%E0%B8%81%E0%B8%A3%E0%B8%B5%E0%B8%A2%E0%B8%A3%E0%B8%B1%E0%B8%A1%E0%B8%A2%E0%B9%8C.html
 http://www.thaiday.com/local/ViewNews.aspx?NewsID=9560000035994
 http://www.oknation.net/blog/CheerBuriramFC/2010/03/06/entry-1
 http://www.phatthalung-fc.com/forum/index.php?topic=2639.0
 http://61.19.246.217/~bbuu/index.php/news/1-latest-news/100-3-0
 http://www.suphanburifc.com/modules.php?name=activeshow_mod&file=print&asid=240
http://int.soccerway.com/players/watchara-krearum/474169/

Krearum, Watchara
Krearum, Watchara
Watchara Krearum
Watchara Krearum
Krearum, Watchara
Watchara Krearum
Songkhla United F.C.
Watchara Krearum
Watchara Krearum
Watchara Krearum
Watchara Krearum
Watchara Krearum
Thai expatriate footballers